Brian Vibberts is an American audio engineer, a native of Portland, Connecticut, who has been active since 1991. He is a 7-time Grammy Award winner (6x Grammy, 1 Latin Grammy) and has participated in the making of numerous albums that have resulted in Grammy Award nominations and winners. Also known by the nickname, "Dr Vibb," he has creatively recorded or mixed many multi-platinum artists in many genres, including Michael Jackson, Aerosmith, The Pussycat Dolls, Bon Jovi, Natasha Bedingfield, Green Day, Trace Adkins, Faith Hill, Toby Keith, Ice Cube, Boyz II Men, Elton John, Eric Clapton, Chick Corea, Brad Paisley, Ringo Starr, Mariah Carey and Tony Bennett.

Early life
Vibberts started playing the drums at 8 years old, progressing to playing in a band as a teenager. While recording, he was more interested as to what was going on in the control room, and thereafter changed career direction.

Career
After graduating from Portland High School (Connecticut) in 1986, Vibberts spent a year in college studying astronomy before transferring to the music production and engineering program at Berklee College of Music in Boston. Upon graduation in 1991, he moved to New York City and began his career at Right Track Recording. It was there he started working with artists such as Mariah Carey, Living Colour, and the Brecker Brothers.

In 1993, he had an opportunity to work at the Hit Factory, to enhance his recording and mixing skills.

From 1993 to 1995, he worked with artists such as Paul Simon, Billy Joel, Celine Dion, Meat Loaf, David Lee Roth and Dave Matthews Band. He also spent an entire year with Michael Jackson working on the album HIStory, which brought his career and their friendship to new heights. Opportunities expanded his expertise from album work to the ability of recording and mixing full orchestras. He raised the bar in the audio engineering field by working with Shawn Murphy, Dan Wallin, John McClure, and Michael Farrow on film scores, Broadway cast albums and Disney Feature Animated films.

Vibberts continued fine-tuning his artistic craft of recording and mixing by co-working with the experienced engineers and producers that he admired. These world-renowned experts like George Martin, Bruce Swedien, David Foster, Walter Afanasieff, Nile Rodgers, Al Schmitt, Tom Lord-Alge, Arif Mardin, Jimmy Jam, Terry Lewis, Tommy LiPuma and Trevor Rabin helped him accomplish high quality studio work. Because of the excellent work he achieved at the Hit Factory, he kept gaining the artists' and producers' respect, which led to more engineering jobs for Kathleen Battle, Heavy D, and additional recording sessions for Michael Jackson. During the three years of working at the Hit Factory, he did sessions with record executives Tommy Mottola, Clive Davis, Don Ienner, Ahmet Ertegun, and Dave Glew.

From 1995 to 2000, Vibberts was hired as a staff engineer at Sony Music Studios and continued his high standards of engineering when working on sessions with artists such as Tony Bennett, Mariah Carey, Sting, Garth Brooks, Lauryn Hill, Jewel, Bruce Springsteen, and producers such as Phil Ramone, Jack Douglas, and Daniel Lanois. One of the highlights of his career was mixing half of the Herbie Hancock album Gershwin's World, recommended by Bruce Swedien. The album won four out of the five Grammy Awards it was nominated for, including Jazz Album of the Year.

From 2000, Vibberts relocated to Los Angeles, where he was hired by Ocean Way Recording, and periodically worked with established producer and mixer Jack Joseph Puig until 2005. The move opened opportunities to work with Mick Jagger, Fiona Apple, Paul McCartney, Tim McGraw, Clint Black, Joss Stone, Counting Crows, Eartha Kitt and Bon Jovi.

In 2002, he worked on the 2002 MTV Icon Award for Aerosmith, with Pink, Shakira, Train, and Janet Jackson. Another project was working on the 2003 MTV Icon Award show for Metallica, with Avril Lavigne, Sum 41, Limp Bizkit, Korn, and Staind. Vibberts partnered with Effanel Music on these live shows:

Vibberts was a broadcast mixer for the Budweiser Made in America Festival in Los Angeles, NewNowNext Awards 2013, Tegan and Sara, Kesha, and VH1's Do Something Awards 2013, mixing Sara Bareilles. He also recorded the Justin Timberlake and Jay-Z Legends of the Summer Tour at the Rose Bowl Stadium where he partnered with Music Mix Mobile (which is a remote recording truck) for this recording.

From 2009 to the present day, Vibberts has been co-founder, producer and engineer at Spotlight 87 Entertainment.

Technical discography credits
Selected credits;
 1993 Billy Joel - River of Dreams
 1993 Various - The Who's Tommy (original cast recording).
 1993 Ryuichi Sakamoto - Little Buddha
 1995 Michael Jackson - HIStory: Past, Present and Future, Book I
 1995 Mariah Carey - Daydream
 1997 Mychael Danna - Kama Sutra: A Tale of Love (Original Motion Picture Soundtrack)
 1997 Alan Menken, David Zippel - Disney's Hercules (An Original Walt Disney Records Soundtrack)
 1998 Lauryn Hill - The Miseducation of Lauryn Hill
 1998 Herbie Hancock - Gershwin's World
 1999 Marc Anthony - Marc Anthony
 1999 Savage Garden - Affirmation
 2000 Boyz II Men - The Ballad Collection
 2003 Stereophonics - You Gotta Go There To Come Back
 2004 Marc Anthony - Valió la Pena
 2004 Green Day - American Idiot
 2005 Pussycat Dolls - PCD (album)
 2006 Eric Clapton & JJ Cale - The Road to Escondido
 2011 Chick Corea, Stanley Clarke and Lenny White - Forever 
 2013 Chick Corea Trio - Trilogy
 2015 Chick Corea & Béla Fleck - Two 
 2015 Lalah Hathaway - Live
 2015 Winter Symphony - Jennifer Thomas (pianist) album  2018 The Fire Within - Jennifer Thomas (pianist) album
 2018  A Winter Blessing the Gift - SEAY 

Extended discography;

Filmography
2008 Dead Space: Downfall (Video) (score mixer)
2003 Jeepers Creepers 2 (additional score recordist)
1997 Hercules (music recording assistant)
1996 Kama Sutra: A Tale of Love (assistant sound engineer) 
IMDb;

Grammy Awards
2015 Trilogy by the Chick Corea Trio, featuring Christian McBride and Brian Blade - Best Jazz Instrumental Album
2012  Forever by Chick Corea, Stanley Clarke, and Lenny White - Best Jazz Instrumental Album
2010  Live by Five Peace Band - Best Jazz Instrumental Album, Individual or Group
2009  The New Crystal Silence by Chick Corea and Gary Burton - Best Jazz Instrumental Album, Individual or Group

Latin Grammy Awards
 2011 Forever'' by Chick Corea, Stanley Clarke, and Lenny White - Best Instrumental Album

Personal life
Over the years Vibberts has amassed a collection of over 9,000 CDs from all genres. In addition to music, Vibberts takes a great interest in astronomy and physics, having graduated in the subjects at the University of Massachusetts, Amherst.

References

Year of birth missing (living people)
Living people
Record producers from Connecticut
American audio engineers
Grammy Award winners
Latin Grammy Award winners
People from Portland, Connecticut
University of Massachusetts Amherst alumni
Berklee College of Music alumni